Kuhak, (Persian: كوهک, also Romanized as Kūhak) is a village in Bam Pasht District, Saravan County, Sistan and Baluchestan Province, Iran. At the 2006 census, its population was 9,267 (1989 households). It is also Iran's easternmost village and is close to the Pakistani border. Road 92 passes through it.

References

Districts of Sistan and Baluchestan Province